Colobaea americana is a species of marsh fly in the family Sciomyzidae.

Distribution
Canada, United States.

References

Sciomyzidae
Insects described in 1954
Diptera of North America
Taxa named by George C. Steyskal